Pseudoxanthochlorus is a genus of flies in the family Dolichopodidae. The genus contains only one species, Pseudoxanthochlorus micropygus, known from Yakovlevka, Primorsky Krai in Russia.

References 

Dolichopodidae genera
Peloropeodinae
Diptera of Asia
Insects of Russia
Fauna of the Russian Far East
Endemic fauna of Primorsky Krai
Monotypic Diptera genera